Manchester High School is a coeducational secondary school located at 9 Perth Road in the town of Mandeville, Jamaica.

History 
Manchester High School was established for the purpose of providing "a good middle class education" to boys and girls. Since portions of the current parish of Manchester were a part of Vere, the funds from the Vere Trust, a result of charitable donations from several individuals, were used in 1855 to establish several institutions.  

Manchester Middle Grade and Elementary schools had separate sections for boys and girls and were conducted on premises adjacent to St. Mark's Anglican Church (Mandeville Parish Church) beginning April 20, 1861. Prior to this, the school was located in the lower storey of the Mandeville Court House, then on the premises of a private citizen. In 1952, the current site of the institution on Perth Road was acquired from the Anglican Church after the primary and middle schools moved to the campus currently known as Mandeville Primary and Junior High School and the school was officially opened in 1953.

Principals 
 Matthew Forbes "M.F." Johns (1883 - 1927)
 Sir Phillip Sherlock (1927 - 1929)
 Clarence Webb-Harris (1929 - 1943)
 Lewis Davidson (acting 1943)
 P. J. Eyre (1944 - 1945)
 John "J.C." Sleggs (1946 - 1959)
 Raymond "Gerry" German (1960 - 1966)
 Herbert Neita (acting 1966 - 1968)
 Ferdinand Gunter (1968 - 1981)
 Caswell Burton (1982 - 1991)
 Branford Gayle (1992 - 2004)
 Jasford Gabriel (2006 - present)

Accomplishments

Rhodes Scholars 
 Chevano Baker (2019)

Inter-Secondary Schools Sports Association (ISSA) Boys and Girls Championships

Girls' Championships 

 1961
 1994
 1995

Headley Cup 
 2013
 2019

TVJ's All Together Sing 
 2012
 2015
 2022

Schools Challenge Quiz 
 1976
 1982

ISSA Basketball 
2014 Boys' Under-14 Central Championship 
2014 Boys' Under-14 All-Island Championship
2022 Boys' Under-19 Central Championship

Notable alumni

Politics and law 

 Christopher Tufton, Member of Parliament for Saint Catherine West Central (Jamaica Parliament constituency), Minister of Health and Wellness
 Nicole Foster-Pusey, Court of Appeal Judge in the Judiciary of Jamaica
 Jewel Scott, Superior Court Judge in Clayton County, Georgia
 Alison Smith, first black female president of the Broward County Bar Association

Arts and culture 

 Sheryl Lee Ralph, Jamaican-American actress, singer, author and activist
 Anton Phillips, Jamaican-born British actor
 Lila Iké, Reggae singer and songwriter
 Luciano,  Roots Reggae singer and songwriter 
 Nigel Staff, Songwriter, producer and composer

Sports 

 Lorraine Fenton,  400m national record holder and Olympic silver medallist 
Sherone Simpson, 4 × 100m relay Olympic champion
 Nesta Carter, 4 × 100m relay Olympic champion
 Omar McLeod, 110m hurdles national record holder and Olympic champion
 Elaine Thompson Herah, 100m, 200m Olympic champion
 Natoya Goule, 800m national record holder and Olympian
Chanice Porter, long jump athlete and Olympian
Jason Johnson, Major League Soccer and member of the Reggae Boyz
Colin Heron, first-class cricket player

Medicine 
 Carl Bruce, Neurosurgeon and Medical Chief of Staff at the University Hospital of the West Indies

Business 
 Brian Paisley, President of the Advertising Agencies Association of Jamaica (AAAJ)

References

External links 

 Official website

Schools in Jamaica
1856 establishments in the British Empire